The European Youth Event (EYE) is an international event initiated and hosted bi-annually by the European Parliament since 2014 with the aim of stimulating active citizenship amongst young Europeans.

The EYE brings together thousands of young people from all over the European Union and beyond at the European Parliament in Strasbourg and online in order to share and shape their ideas on Europe’s future.

During the event, participants take part in activities co-created with institutions, international organisations, civil society, youth organisations and the participants themselves, offering a space for discussions and networking. The most recent edition took place on 9–10 October 2021, with several follow-up events taking place in the following months.

EYE2023, the fifth in-person edition of the event, will take place on 9–10 June 2023.

The EYE also provides year-round online activities that create opportunities for wider public discussions on the most pressing issues facing Europe today.

Objective of the EYE 

The EYE allows 16 to 30 year olds to exchange their views with experts, activists, influencers and decision-makers.

EYE Report 

Following the EYE the ideas of the young people attending are collected in the EYE Report and distributed to all Members of the European Parliament (MEPs).

In order to collect and highlight the ideas and suggestions of the participants, a team of young journalists - coordinated by the European Youth Press and with a political commentary from the European Youth Forum - have written these reports in 2014, 2016 and 2018.

In 2021, the European Parliament collected over 1,500 ideas and proposals from young citizens on the website youthideas.eu. The most popular ideas from consultations with young people, chosen by the EYE editorial team, were taken to EYE2021 and further developed by participants during brainstorming sessions. From these, 20 ideas were selected and all EYE participants, both onsite and online, voted for the top 5 ideas which were presented at the EYE’s closing session. The report was presented to the Conference on the Future of Europe and the Members of the European Parliament to serve as inspiration for the political debate and future policy proposals.

EYE Hearings 

After the event, some participants can further develop the most popular ideas and present these directly to MEPs during the EYE Hearings.

During the Hearings, MEPs give feedback to former EYE participants on which ideas they endorse, plan to implement in the future or disagree with.

Yo!Fest 

During the first three EYE editions, the Yo!Fest was organised by the European Youth Forum alongside the main event.  The content of Yo!Fest was designed and delivered by youth organisations and youth groups from across Europe.

Sustainability and accessibility 
The EYE works to promote equality, inclusiveness and sustainability with a strong commitment to accessibility for everyone. The event aims to implement solutions that make it sustainable and environmentally friendly and to accommodate the needs of the participants. In 2021, the EYE obtained the ISO 20121 certification for sustainable event management.

Editions

EYE2014: Ideas for a better Europe 

The first edition, the European Youth Event 2014 (#EYE2014) saw the participation of 5,000 young Europeans, 400 speakers and many supporting partners and youth associations who came to the Parliament's premises in Strasbourg on 9–11 May 2014 to share their ideas and thoughts on a multitude of youth-related topics.

The EYE2014's five main themes included youth unemployment, the digital revolution, sustainability, European values and the future of the European Union.

EYE2016: Together we can make a change 

The second edition (#EYE2016) took place on 20–21 May 2016 and was an occasion for Europe's youth to make their opinions heard on many issues, offering political debates and workshops with decision-makers.

This edition saw 7,500 young people from across Europe debating topics ranging from space and innovation to climate change, migration and democracy.
  
The EYE2016's five main themes were: War and Peace: Perspectives for a peaceful planet; Apathy or Participation: Agenda for a vibrant democracy; Exclusion or Access: Crackdown on youth unemployment; Stagnation or Innovation: Tomorrow's world of work and Collapse or Success: New ways for a sustainable Europe.

EYE2018: The plan is to fan this spark into a flame 
The third edition (#EYE2018) took place on 1–2 June 2018.

At EYE2018, 8000 young Europeans engaged in various activities, revolving around the event’s five main themes: Young and old: Keeping up with the digital revolution; Rich and poor: Calling for a fair share; Apart and together: Working out for a stronger Europe; Safe and dangerous: Staying alive in turbulent times; Local and global: Protecting our planet.

Young Europeans also had the opportunity to participate online by sharing their ideas about the future of Europe via the European Youth Ideas website.

EYE2020: online edition 
The European Parliament decided to postpone EYE2020, originally planned for May 2020, in view of the exceptional measures taken in relation with the COVID-19 outbreak. To compensate for the postponement, the European Parliament presented a special online edition of the event.

The first series of EYE Online events took place between early April and end of May 2020, and offered a variety of activities focusing on topics including mental health, future of education, food of tomorrow and rural renewal, fake news, slow shopping, future of work, mass surveillance and vaccination.

During this period more than 60 live activities were streamed online. Speakers included, Christine Lagarde, David Maria Sassoli and numerous Members of the European Parliament.

Following the success of this virtual event, it was decided that EYE Online events would take place regularly.

EYE2021: The future is ours 

The fourth edition (#EYE2021) took place on 8–9 October 2021 and brought together 5,000 young people at the European Parliament in Strasbourg and another 5,000 online in order to discuss over 2,000 ideas to shape the future of Europe.

EYE2021 was the culmination of the European Parliament’s youth consultation process for the Conference on the Future of Europe. Started in May 2021, in collaboration with pan-European youth organisations, young people’s ideas on the future of Europe were collected on youthideas.eu.

The most popular 20 ideas from EYE2021 were presented to the Members of the Conference and input into the political debate within the European Parliament.

References

External links 
 

European Parliament